Eberhard Stroot (born 20 March 1951) is a German athlete. He competed in the men's decathlon at the 1976 Summer Olympics.

References

1951 births
Living people
Athletes (track and field) at the 1976 Summer Olympics
German decathletes
Olympic athletes of West Germany
People from Neuwied (district)
Sportspeople from Rhineland-Palatinate